Kentucky Route 710 (KY 710) is a  state highway in central Meade County, Kentucky, that runs from KY 428 southeast of Guston to KY KY448 and Hill Street in downtown Brandenburg.

Major intersections

References

0710
0710